Marjan Salahshouri (born 12 October 1996) is an Iranian taekwondo practitioner. She represented Iran at the 2018 Asian Games and claimed a silver medal in the women's poomsae individual event. This medal was only the second medal to be received by Iran on the opening day of the 2018 Asian Games.

Marjan Salahshouri also notably claimed a World Poomsae Championship bronze medal in 2016 before clinching a gold medal in the individual poomsae event and a bronze medal in the women's team event during the 2017 Asian Indoor and Martial Arts Games.

References

External links 

1996 births
Living people
Iranian female taekwondo practitioners
Taekwondo practitioners at the 2018 Asian Games
Medalists at the 2018 Asian Games
Asian Games silver medalists for Iran
Asian Games medalists in taekwondo
Universiade bronze medalists for Iran
Universiade medalists in taekwondo
Medalists at the 2015 Summer Universiade
Medalists at the 2019 Summer Universiade
21st-century Iranian women